Joe or Joseph McBride may refer to:

Footballers
 Joe McBride (footballer, born 1938) (1938–2012), Scottish football player
 Joe McBride (footballer, born 1960), Scottish football player and coach

Others
 Joseph McBride (writer) (born 1947), American, also academic
 Joseph Macay McBride (born 1982), American baseball player
 Joe McBride (musician) keyboardist/singer and nephew of Bake McBride

See also 
 Joseph MacBride (died 1938), Irish activist & politician